The Magic of Herself the Elf (also known by its on-screen title, The Special Magic of Herself the Elf) is a 1983 American animated television special that premiered in the United States on July 30, 1983 in broadcast syndication. The special was produced by the Canadian animation company, Nelvana Limited, Scholastic Entertainment, and Those Characters from Cleveland, and distributed by Lexington Broadcast Services.

Directed by John Celestri (credited under first name Gian) and Raymond Jafelice, it stars the voices of Jerry Orbach, Georgia Engel and Priscilla Lopez. The music was sung and performed, though not written, by Judy Collins. The special is based on the American Greetings/Mattel property, Herself the Elf, starring Terri Hawkes. It was released once on video by Scholastic/Lorimar (later Karl-Lorimar). There are no home video releases to date, except old tapings of the special.

Cast
 Denny Dillon  as Meadow Morn (voice)
 Georgia Engel  as Willow Song (voice)
 Ellen Greene  as Creeping Ivy (voice)
 Terri Hawkes  as Snow Drop (voice)
 Jim Henshaw  as Wilfie - a Wood Sprite (voice)
 Priscilla Lopez  as Herself the Elf (voice)
 Jerry Orbach  as King Thorn (voice)
 Susan Roman  as Wood Pink (voice)

References

External links

1983 films
1983 television specials
1980s animated television specials
Films based on Mattel toys
Canadian animated television films
Nelvana television specials
1980s Canadian films